The 1947 Invercargill mayoral election was part of the New Zealand local elections held that same year. The polling was conducted using the standard first-past-the-post electoral method.

Background
The incumbent mayor Abraham Wachner sought another term and was re-elected to the position despite a challenge from former Invercargill Borough Councillor and Labour MP William Denham.

Results
The following table gives the election results:

References

1947 elections in New Zealand
Mayoral elections in Invercargill
November 1947 events in New Zealand